Jeffrey Ryan is a Canadian curler.

Awards
Manitoba Sports Hall of Fame: inducted in 2002 with all of 1995 Kerry Burtnyk team, Canadian and World champions

Teams

Personal life
Jeff Ryan is from family of curlers: his brother is Pat Ryan, a three-time Brier winner and two-time world champion; his daughter Hailey played third for Manitoba on 2017 Canadian Juniors and on 2019 Manitoba Scotties; his son J. T. Ryan skipped his team on 2017, 2018 Viterra and on 2017 Canadian Juniors.

References

External links
 
 Jeff Ryan – Curling Canada Stats Archive
 Video: 

Living people
Canadian male curlers
Curlers from Manitoba
World curling champions
Brier champions
Year of birth missing (living people)